Radar Station may refer to:
 Radar station
 Radar Station (film), a 1953 Canadian short documentary film 
 Radar Station, Mazandaran, a village and military installation in Mazandaran Province, Iran
 Radar Station, Charlie's Hill, a heritage-listed radar station, Queensland, Australia